Denis Matsukevich and Andrei Vasilevski were the defending champions but chose to defend their title with different partners. Matsukevich partnered Riccardo Ghedin but lost in the quarterfinals to Laurynas Grigelis and Zdeněk Kolář. Vasilevski partnered Hans Podlipnik-Castillo but lost in the semifinals to Prajnesh Gunneswaran and Vishnu Vardhan.

Grigelis and Kolář won the title after defeating Gunneswaran and Vardhan 7–6(7–2), 6–3 in the final.

Seeds

Draw

References
 Main Draw

Samarkand Challenger - Doubles
2017 Doubles